Danny Williams may refer to:

Government
Danny Williams (Canadian politician) (born 1949), former premier of Newfoundland and Labrador
Danny Williams (Oklahoma politician), member of the Oklahoma House of Representatives
Danny C. Williams Sr., United States Attorney for the Northern District of Oklahoma, 2012–2017

Media
Danny Williams (singer) (1942–2005), South African-born popular musician
Danny Williams, Australian singer for CDB
Danny Williams (TV personality)

Characters
Danny "Danno" Williams, in the 1968–1980 television series Hawaii Five-O, and in the 2010 remake series Hawaii Five-0
Danny Williams, in the television series My Little Pony
Danny Williams, in the FIFA video game series, “The Journey”

Sports

Association football (soccer)
Danny Williams (footballer, born 1924) (1924–2019), English association football player and manager
Danny Williams (footballer, born 1979), Welsh footballer
Danny Williams (footballer, born 1981), English football agent and former player
Danny Williams (footballer, born 1988), English footballer
Danny Williams (soccer, born 1989), German-American soccer player

Rugby
Danny Williams (rugby league, born 1973), Australian rugby league footballer
Danny Williams (rugby league, born 1986), Australian rugby league footballer
Danny Williams (rugby) (born 1986), English rugby league and union footballer

Other sports
Danny Williams (boxer) (born 1973), British heavyweight professional boxer
Danny Williams (judoka) (born 1989), British judoka

See also 
Daniel Williams (disambiguation)
Denny Williams (1893–1929), baseball player